The Lebanese Peace Party ( Hizb Al-Salam Al-Lubnany) is a centrist Lebanese political party, which was founded on 12 July 2006 by Mr. Roger Edde, a businessman from the city of Byblos in Mount Lebanon, alongside other wealthy businessmen and intellects. Edde serves as the leader of the party.

It promotes itself as a secular centrist force with emphasis on issues related to privatization, decentralization and socio-economic priorities.

The Lebanese Peace party's main headquarters is located in Byblos and enjoys reasonable support in that region.

The party is currently allied to the Lebanese Forces and Kataeb Party and is part of the March 14 Alliance.

It has no members in the Lebanese Parliament.

Yorgo Byeklo is the composer (lyrics & music) of the party anthem.

References

External links 

 Lebanese Peace Party Official website
Twitter page

Political parties in Lebanon
March 14 Alliance